The French–Dutch relations are the interstate and bilateral relations between France and the Netherlands. The two countries notably share a border division in the Caribbean island of Saint Martin, to which the northern part of the island is a French overseas collectivity known as the Collectivity of Saint Martin, while the southern part of the island is a Dutch constituent country known as Sint Maarten. Relations between the two countries date back to the 17th and 18th centuries when a conflict led to the transformation of the Dutch Republic to the Batavian Republic and eventually the Kingdom of Holland. The two countries currently enjoy close cultural and economic relations. Both nations are members of the OECD, as well as founding members of the European Union, NATO, and the United Nations.

History

Background
From the 1560s, France and the Dutch Republic considered themselves to be allies until 1668 when the Dutch Republic formed the Triple Alliance with the Kingdom of England and the Swedish Empire to revolt against Louis XIV of France's expansion in the War of Devolution in support of the Spanish Empire, whom France succeeded as the strongest nation in Europe. Feeling betrayed by the Dutch Republic, Louis realized that the Dutch Republic would hinder France in conquering the Spanish Netherlands.

In 1672, Louis was able to convince the Kingdom of England and the Swedish Empire to fight against the Dutch Republic, as Louis had agreed to financially support England. England has already fought in two wars against the Dutch Empire (the First and Second Anglo-Dutch Wars in 1652–1654 and 1665–1667, respectively), prior to their agreement in the Triple Alliance.

Franco-Dutch War
The Franco-Dutch War occurred in 1672–1678, shortly after the Kingdom of England and the Swedish Empire betrayed the Dutch Republic and supported France, disbanding the Triple Alliance. 1672 is considered by the Dutch as the "Disaster Year" (Rampjaar).

Supporting the Spanish Empire, the Dutch Republic was joined by the Margraviate of Brandenburg and the Holy Roman Empire, while the French army expanded through its alliance with the prince-bishops of Münster and Cologne. Prior to the French army's arrival into the Rhine, England had declared their third "navigation war" on the Dutch Republic (Third Anglo-Dutch War) in an attempt of a naval attack, but efforts were thwarted by Dutch admiral Michiel de Ruyter. By June 1672, France had established fortifications within the Rhine, including Rheinberg, Wesel, and Utrecht, and Münsterans began attacking the north, particularly Groningen. The following month, William of Nassau (the later William III) was acclaimed stadtholder. Upon arrival at the Lower Rhine region, the French army began retreating after witnessing the Imperial and Brandenburgian armies. By December, the Dutch were able to liberate a number of occupied territories in the north after the French had retreated while crossing the Dutch Water Line. However, in late 1673, the French army succeeded in capturing Bonn. In February 1674, the Kingdom of England and the Dutch Empire, along with the prince-bishops of Münster and Cologne, signed the Treaty of Westminster, ending the Third Anglo-Dutch War. In August 1674, the Dutch-German-Spanish army entered the territory of northern France, under the command of William III of Orange, where they were met by the French army commanded by Louis II de Condé. In Seneffe, Condé blocked the Dutch-German-Spanish army by detaching about 500 horsemen to keep the Dutch vanguard busy, surrounding the Dutch-German-Spanish army and resulting to a tactical French victory. This became known as the Battle of Seneffe. In 1675, the Swedish army invaded Brandenburg. In March 1678, the French army had entered the Spanish Netherlands and besieged Ghent.

Later that year until 1679, the Treaties of Nijmegen were signed between France, the Dutch Republic, the Holy Roman Empire, the Spanish Empire, the Prince-Bishopric of Münster, and the Swedish Empire, ending the Franco-Dutch War with the Franche-Comté and the Spanish Netherlands belonging to France, making them Europe's strongest power. The war sparked the rivalry between William III, who later conquered England as part of the Glorious Revolution, and Louis XIV, which intensified in the subsequent Nine Years' War (1688–97) and the War of the Spanish Succession (1701–14), both of which the Dutch Republic supported the coalition against the Kingdom of France. Unfortunately for the Dutch Republic, the war also resulted in the decline of the republic's dominance in overseas trade.

Collectivity of Saint Martin–Sint Maarten border

On 23 March 1648, the French Kingdom and the Dutch Republic signed the Treaty of Concordia atop Mount Concordia, in which both agreed to divide the island of Saint Martin into their own territories – the French Kingdom owning the northern part of the island and the Dutch Republic owning the southern part of island.

On 17 May 1994, the French Republic and the Kingdom of the Netherlands signed the Franco-Dutch treaty on Saint Martin border controls in Paris, aimed at improving border control at the two airports on Saint Martin, namely the Princess Juliana International Airport at the Dutch Sint Maarten and the L'Espérance Airport at the French Collectivity of Saint Martin. The treaty was ratified on 1 August 2007. Among the provisions of the treaty is a requirement for a visa or a landing permit for both the Dutch and French sides if a foreigner is to visit the island of Saint Martin. However, the provisions have not been implemented.

On 1 January 2009, the population of Saint Martin was 77,741 inhabitants – 40,917 living on the Dutch Sint Maarten and 36,824 living on the French Collectivity of Saint Martin.

Economic relations
France is the Netherlands' fourth-largest investor, third-largest exporter, and sixth-largest supplier, to which the Netherlands is also France's seventh-largest exporter and fourth-largest importer. According to the French Ministry of Foreign Affairs and International Development, about 400 French companies in the industries of service, metallurgy, and agriculture maintain operations in the Netherlands, including AccorHotels, Air France–KLM, Atos, Capgemini, Engie, Saint-Gobain, Sodexo, Thales Group, and Total S.A. France and the Netherlands have agreed to establish synergies to further enhance bilateral cooperation between the countries' economies, notably the Air France–KLM merger between their flag carriers (Air France and KLM) in 2004 and the Danone takeover of Numico in 2007. The ministry also stated that between 1993 and 2008, Dutch companies maintaining operations in France, including AkzoNobel, DSM, DSV, Heineken International, Royal Dutch Shell, Philips, SHV Holdings, TNT Express, and Vopak, contributed to the creation of 15,000 jobs in the country.

Cultural and scientific cooperation
From 1957 until its closure in 2013, the Institut Néerlandais in Paris promoted Dutch art and culture and was one of the oldest cultural centers in the city. Its counterpart, the Institut Français, has branches in Amsterdam and Groningen that promote French art and culture. A number of French research institutes, including the Centre national de la recherche scientifique, the Institut national de la recherche agronomique, IFREMER, and the French Institute of Health and Medical Research, have signed agreements with Dutch research institutes to enhance collaborative capabilities. The French Ministry of Foreign Affairs and International Development has also stated that French legal culture is being promoted at the International Court of Justice in The Hague.

Drug combat
According to the French Ministry of Foreign Affairs and International Development, France and the Netherlands have cooperated with each other in the prohibition of drugs since 1995 through the leadership of a high-level bilateral group. The two countries hold annual meetings in The Hague and Paris.

State visits 
French President François Hollande visited the Netherlands on 20 January 2014, where he met with King Willem-Alexander, Queen Máxima, and Prime Minister Mark Rutte. He also met with the House of Representatives and the Senate, where he addressed the diplomatic and political ties between the two countries.

Resident diplomatic missions
 France has an embassy in The Hague.
 Netherlands has an embassy in Paris.

See also
 Foreign relations of France
 Foreign relations of the Netherlands

References

Bibliography
 Lynn, John A. The Wars of Louis XIV, 1667–1714. Longman, (1999).

External links
 Dutch Embassy, Paris 
 French Embassy, The Hague

 
Netherlands
Bilateral relations of the Netherlands